The Windsor Hotel Taichung is a set of twin skyscrapers completed in 2005 in Xitun District, Taichung, Taiwan.

The Hotel
The five-star hotel has a total of 149 rooms including premium suites, themed restaurants, a café.

Restaurants 
 Windsor Café Buffet: Buffet offering signature dishes from around the world.
 Zhe Abalone Chinese Restaurant: Chinese restaurant featuring traditional authentic Cantonese cuisine and Dim Sum. It offers three large independent rooms and four intimate rooms for private gatherings.
 Rose Corner Bakery: Bakery offering fresh pastries and beverages.
 Gen Zen Japanese Restaurant/Teppanyaki: Restaurant located on the 3rd floor offering Japanese-style teppanyaki.

Gallery

See also
 Le Meridien Taichung
 National Hotel (Taiwan)
 Millennium Vee Hotel Taichung
 The Splendor Hotel Taichung

References

External links
Windsor Hotel Taichung Official Website 
 Windsor Hotel Taichung - Tourism Bureau of the Ministry of Transport of the Republic of China 

2005 establishments in Taiwan
Buildings and structures in Taichung
Skyscraper office buildings in Taichung
Skyscraper hotels in Taichung
Hotel buildings completed in 2005
Twin towers